Edward McLaren (8 September 1929 – 23 December 2020) was a Scottish professional footballer who made over 180 appearances as a right back and wing half in the Football League for Reading.

References 

1929 births
2020 deaths
Association football fullbacks
Association football wing halves
English Football League players
Footballers from Dundee
Guildford City F.C. players
Reading F.C. players
Scottish footballers
Southern Football League players